UBCO Tower is an approved skyscraper in Kelowna, British Columbia. At 43 storeys tall, it will be the tallest building between Calgary and Metro Vancouver. It will serve as the downtown Kelowna campus of the UBCO.

References

Buildings and structures in Kelowna
Proposed skyscrapers in Canada